Teodomirus of Dumium was a medieval Galician Bishop of Mondoñedo from 972 to 977.

References
Episcopologio Mindoniense. CAL PARDO, Enrique, 2003, .
Manuel Carriedo Tejedo, "Cronología de los obispos mindonienses del siglo X", El legado cultural de la iglesia mindoniense : Ferrol, 16, 17, 18 de setembro, 1999 : I Congreso do Patrimonio da Diocesis de Mondoñedo, pp. 235–253

External links
 Official web site of the Diocese of Mondoñedo-Ferrol

10th-century Galician bishops